Jirnexu Sdn Bhd (Jirnexu) is a Southeast Asian financial technology startup headquartered in Kuala Lumpur, Malaysia. The company provides technology to help financial institutions manage different stages of the customer journey: marketing, acquisition, fulfilment and retention.

Business operations
The company currently has both business-to-business (B2B) and business-to-consumer (B2C) operations in Malaysia and Indonesia.

Companies working with Jirnexu include Citibank, HSBC, Standard Chartered, Alliance Bank, AEON, AIA, Zurich, Manulife, U4Life, BSN, RHB, and U Mobile.

History & background 
Jirnexu was formerly known as Saving Plus. In 2012, former Citi banker Yuen Tuck Siew and James Barnes founded RinggitPlus.com, a comparison and application website for financial products in Malaysia.

The website was officially launched in 2013 to allow comparison of and application for credit cards, home loans, car loans, investments and insurance schemes.

In 2014, RinggitPlus.com merged with SaveMoney.my, an online portal that provides information on different credit cards, car loans, phone, travel and shopping in Malaysia. SaveMoney.my was founded by Liew Ooi Hann and Lucas Ooi in 2012. Following the merger, Saving Plus Sdn Bhd was incorporated while RinggitPlus.com continued to operate as a comparison website.

In 2016, Saving Plus rebranded itself to Jirnexu; the name means “prosper” in Maltese. The company launched XpressApply, an online application and CRM technology as part of its business to provide financial institutions a channel to reach consumers digitally by handling banking product applications online.

Several venture capital firms have funded Jirnexu, including SBI Group, Celebes Capital, NTT DoCoMo Ventures, Nullabor, Tuas Capital Partners, Anfield Equities, Digital Media Partners, Gobi Partners, OSK Ventures International Berhad and private investor Steve Melhuish.

In October 2017, Jirnexu reported having total funding of US$8.0 million.

In July 2021, Jirnexu announced that it has signed strategic partnership agreements with more than five consortia in their bids for a Malaysian digital banking license. Bank Negara Malaysia (BNM), the central bank of Malaysia will announce up to five successful applicants for digital banking licenses in the first quarter of 2022.

See also
 Personal finance
 Financial services
 Financial technology
 FinTech SaaS

References

External links
Official Website
Projectzo Website

2012 establishments in Malaysia
Financial services companies established in 2012
Companies based in Kuala Lumpur
Financial services companies of Malaysia
Finance websites
Personal finance education
Financial technology companies
Comparison shopping websites
Malaysian brands